Joel T. Schumacher (August 29, 1939June 22, 2020) was an American film director, producer and screenwriter. Raised in New York City by his mother, Schumacher graduated from Parsons School of Design and originally became a fashion designer. He first entered filmmaking as a production and costume designer before gaining writing credits on Car Wash, Sparkle, and The Wiz.

Schumacher received little attention for his first theatrically released films, The Incredible Shrinking Woman and D.C. Cab, but rose to prominence after directing St. Elmo's Fire, The Lost Boys, and The Client. Schumacher was selected to replace Tim Burton as director of the Batman franchise and oversaw Batman Forever and Batman & Robin. Later, Schumacher directed smaller-budgeted films, including Tigerland and Phone Booth. In 2004, he directed The Phantom of the Opera, which was released to mixed reviews. His final directorial work was two episodes of House of Cards.

Early life and education

Joel T. Schumacher was born on August 29, 1939, in New York City. His parents were Francis Schumacher, a Baptist from Knoxville, Tennessee, who died from pneumonia when Joel was four, and Marian (Kantor), a Swedish Jew. He was raised by his mother in Long Island City. During his youth, he used LSD and methamphetamine and started drinking alcohol by age nine. In 1965, he graduated from Parsons School of Design, after having studied at the Fashion Institute of Technology, and later became a designer for Revlon in 1966.

However, in 1970, he stopped using drugs and became employed at Henri Bendel. He later stated that "I got my self-respect back getting a good day's pay for a good day's work."

Career

Production designer

In 1972, Schumacher served as a costume designer for Play It as It Lays and designed the wardrobes of Dyan Cannon, Joan Hackett, and Raquel Welch for the film The Last of Sheila. In 1973, he served as a costume designer for Woody Allen's Sleeper, and Paul Mazursky's Blume in Love. In 1974, he served as the production designer of Killer Bees. He later served as a costume designer for The Time of the Cuckoo, The Prisoner of Second Avenue and Interiors.

Early filmmaking

In 1974, Schumacher wrote a script for an eponymous biographic made-for-television movie based on the life of Virginia Hill. He was selected to serve as the movie's director and started filming on September 9.

In 1974, he and Howard Rosenman wrote the script for Sparkle which later went into production in 1975, and was released in 1976. His original plan for the film was for the film to be a "black Gone with the Wind", but had to be modest due to the limited budget given to the production by Warner Bros. According to Schumacher the film represented his "personal fascination" with Jesse Jackson, Angela Davis, Tammi Terrell, and Diana Ross. He was later selected to write the screenplays for Car Wash and The Wiz.

In 1978, Schumacher was selected to serve as the director of Amateur Night at the Dixie Bar and Grill which was later released in 1979. On January 31, 1980, he submitted a script for A Chorus Line, but the film underwent rewrites in development hell.

In 1979, he was selected to serve as the director of The Incredible Shrinking Woman, his first theatrically released film, to replace John Landis, who had left after Universal Pictures had reduced the film's budget. In 1981, the film was released to negative reviews, and was a box office bomb. The film was initially given a $30 million budget, but it was reduced to $11–13 million although it would later rise to over $20 million due to the cost of special effects.

In 1983, he directed D.C. Cab starring Mr. T, but later stated that he only worked on the film as he needed a job.

St. Elmo's Fire and The Lost Boys

In 1984, Schumacher was selected by Columbia Pictures to direct St. Elmo's Fire and was secretive during the production of the film. In 1987, he directed The Lost Boys. Both films were successful among young people and were his first major critical and commercial successes.

Following The Lost Boys, Schumacher directed Cousins (a remake of the French film Cousin Cousine), Flatliners, Dying Young, Falling Down, and The Client.

Batman
Schumacher was selected by Warner Bros. in 1993 to replace Tim Burton as the director of the Batman franchise. He directed Batman Forever, which was a stylistic departure from Burton's Batman and Batman Returns. Batman Forever was released to mixed reviews, but was more financially successful than Batman Returns.

He later directed Batman & Robin, which was rushed into production following Batman Forever and was intentionally made toyetic and light-hearted to appeal to children and sell merchandise. The film was released to largely negative reviews and did not perform as well at the box-office as any of its predecessors causing a planned sequel, Batman Unchained, to be cancelled. Schumacher later approached Warner Bros. to pitch concepts for a new Batman movie which were inspired by Frank Miller's graphic novels, Batman: Year One and The Dark Knight Returns. But due to the box-office bomb of Batman & Robin along with the negative impact that the film had on his reputation, Warner Bros. refused to let him develop another Batman film. Schumacher later apologized for the quality of Batman & Robin in 2017.

It was alleged that Schumacher, a gay man, had added homoerotic elements to the film with the most prominent being the rubber nipples, codpieces, and close-up camera shots of Batman and Robin's buttocks. Schumacher stated that the designs of the suits had been based on anatomically correct Greek statues and medical drawings. However, in 2005, Clooney said that Schumacher told him that Batman was gay.

Later career

Following Batman & Robin Schumacher directed 8mm, Flawless, Tigerland, Bad Company, Phone Booth, Veronica Guerin, The Phantom of the Opera, The Number 23, Blood Creek, Twelve, and Trespass.

In August 2008, Schumacher directed the music video for American rock band Scars on Broadway, for their single "World Long Gone".

In 2013, he directed two episodes of the television series House of Cards.

Personal life
Schumacher described himself as "extremely promiscuous", saying in a 2019 interview that he became sexually active at age eleven, and estimating that he had sex with between 10,000 and 20,000 men over the course of his life. Schumacher said the first person he knew who died from the AIDS epidemic, in 1983, "was not promiscuous", leading Schumacher to believe he would die soon after, recalling that he thought at the time, "If he has it, I must have it quadrupled [...] I was sure I had it, I was planning my death", though he never contracted the disease.

In 1984, Schumacher purchased the horse stables that had belonged to Rudolph Valentino from Doris Duke.

Schumacher donated to Democratic Party candidates, including multiple congressional campaigns as well as John Kerry's 2004 presidential campaign.

Death
On June 22, 2020, Schumacher died from cancer. Following his death, he was praised by Jim Carrey and Matthew McConaughey, who credited Schumacher with launching their careers.

Filmography

Films

Filmmaking credits 

Executive producer
 The Babysitter (1995)
 Gossip (2000)

Other credits

Television

Filmmaking credits

Other credits

Music videos

Directing credits

References

External links

 
 
 Joel Schumacher interview

1939 births
2020 deaths
American music video directors
American people of Swedish-Jewish descent
Deaths from cancer in New York (state)
Fashion Institute of Technology alumni
Film directors from New York City
Film producers from New York (state)
American gay writers
LGBT Jews
LGBT film directors
LGBT people from New York (state)
LGBT producers
American LGBT screenwriters
People from Long Island City, Queens
New York (state) Democrats
Parsons School of Design alumni
Screenwriters from New York (state)